Vangjel Dule (Evangelos Doules; born 1968 in Gjirokastër) is a politician who belongs to the ethnic Greek minority of Albania. Since 2002, he is the chairman of the Unity for Human Rights Party, a political party that focuses on the rights of minorities in Albania.

Dule is a graduate of the University of Tirana where he studied English language. He is a representative in the Vlore County from 2001. In 2002–2006, as well as in 2007–2010, Dule was a member of the Parliamentary Assembly of the Council of Europe.

References

Year of birth missing (living people)
Living people
People from Gjirokastër
Political party leaders of Albania
Members of the Parliament of Albania
Albanian people of Greek descent
University of Tirana alumni
21st-century Albanian politicians